Dendrodoris nigra is a species of sea slug, a dorid nudibranch, shell-less marine gastropod mollusks in the family Dendrodorididae.

Description
Up to 7 cm long. Black, sometimes with cream or white spots, the rhinophores with an elongated white knob at the tip. The edge of the mantle is frilly, the rest of the body very soft and slimy.

Habitat
eulittoral zone under rocks and boulders on coral rubble, gravel, algal beds or shelly sand in sheltered bays.

Distribution
W Indian Ocean, Red Sea to W Pacific Ocean; tropical Indo-Pacific.

References

 Brodie G.D., Willan R.C. & Collins J.D. (1997) Taxonomy and occurrence of Dendrodoris nigra and Dendrodoris fumata (Nudibranchia: Dendrodorididae) in the Indo-West Pacific region. Journal of Molluscan Studies 63: 407-423

Dendrodorididae
Gastropods described in 1924